Zechariah most often refers to:
 Zechariah (Hebrew prophet), author of the Book of Zechariah
 Zechariah (New Testament figure), father of John the Baptist

Zechariah or its many variant forms and spellings may also refer to:

People
Zechariah (given name), a given name (with list of people and fictional characters with the name); includes all the variants (Zacharias, Zecharias, Zechariah, etc.)
Zacharias (surname) and various related forms (with list of people with the name)
Zachary, a given name (and list of people with the name)
Zakariya, list of people with Arabic variants of this name; includes all the variants (Zakariyya, Zakaria, Zekaria)

Bible
Book of Zechariah
Zechariah of Israel, king of Israel for 6 months c. 752 BCE
Zechariah ben Jehoiada, a priest

Places
Saint-Zacharie, Quebec, a municipality in Canada
Zacharia, Kentucky
Zachariah, Kentucky
Zacarias, São Paulo, a municipality in Brazil
Zacharia, Democratic Republic of the Congo, a town
Zekharia, a moshav in Israel
Az-Zakariyya, a depopulated Palestinian village in the Hebron sub district
Khirbat Zakariyya, a depopulated Palestinian village in the Ramle sub district
Khirbet Beit Zakariyyah, a village in the Bethlehem Governorate, Palestine
Tell Zakariya, old name of ruin that is now called "Azekah"

Other uses
Zachariah (film), a 1971 film starring John Rubinstein and Don Johnson
Zacharias and Co., a former waterproof clothing manufacturing firm and retailer based in Oxford, England
Z for Zachariah, 1974 American science fiction novel by Robert C. O'Brien
Z for Zachariah (Play for Today), 1984 BBC television adaptation
Z for Zachariah (film), 2015 film adaptation
Sdot Micha Airbase or Zekharia Airbase, an airbase near Zekharia

See also
Zachary (disambiguation)
Zechariah (list of biblical figures)